Staroyaksheyevo (İśke Yaqşıy) is a rural locality (a village) in Starobaltachevsky Selsoviet, Baltachevsky District, Bashkortostan, Russia. The population was 528 as of 2010. There are 18 streets.

Geography 
Staroyaksheyevo is located 3 km west of Starobaltachevo (the district's administrative centre) by road. Starobaltachevo is the nearest rural locality.

References 

Rural localities in Baltachevsky District